Jean Williams Brown (born c. 1952) was a justice of the Supreme Court of Alabama from 1999 to 2005.

Brown was born around 1952 and raised in Birmingham, Alabama. She earned her bachelor's degree from Samford University (1974) and a J.D. degree from the University of Alabama School of Law (1977). Her legal career has included working as an Assistant District Attorney in Montgomery, Alabama and serving as a Judge of the Alabama Court of Criminal Appeals.  In 1999, Brown was elected as a justice of the Supreme Court of Alabama. She was defeated for reelection in a 2005 campaign directed in part at her participation in a ruling requiring the removal of a statue of the Ten Commandments from state property. In 2019, Brown was appointed as a commissioner for the Alabama Department of Senior Services.

See also

 Supreme Court of Alabama
 List of justices of the Alabama Supreme Court

References

Justices of the Supreme Court of Alabama
American women judges
Samford University alumni
University of Alabama School of Law alumni
1950s births
Living people
21st-century American women
20th-century American women judges
20th-century American judges
21st-century American women judges
21st-century American judges